The following list includes notable people who were born or have lived in Decatur, Illinois. For a similar list organized alphabetically by last name, see the category page People from Decatur, Illinois.

Authors and academics

Commerce

Crime

Media and arts

Bands

Military

Philanthropist

Politics

Sports

Baseball

Basketball

Football

Other sports

References

Decatur
Decatur